Elangi Union is a union parishad of Kotchandpur Upazila, in Jhenaidah District, Khulna Division of Bangladesh. There are 15 villages and 15 mouzas in the union.

References

External links
 

Unions of Khulna Division
Unions of Kotchandpur Upazila
Unions of Jhenaidah District